Charles François Duhoux d'Hauterive (13 August 1736 – May 1799) fought in the War of the Austrian Succession and Seven Years' War, rising in rank to become a lieutenant colonel of cavalry. He became a French general officer during the French Revolutionary Wars. He was involved in a controversy during the 1792 Siege of Lille and later sent to fight in the War in the Vendée where he was wounded twice. After being defeated in battle by his Royalist nephew he was imprisoned but finally allowed to retire.

References

French generals
French military personnel of the War of the Austrian Succession
French military personnel of the Seven Years' War
French Republican military leaders of the French Revolutionary Wars
Republican military leaders of the War in the Vendée
People from Meurthe-et-Moselle
1736 births
1799 deaths